Flying Devils (a.k.a. The Flying Circus or Flying Circus) is a 1933 American Pre-Code action film dealing with aviation. The film was directed by former Hollywood agent Russell Birdwell and photographed by film noir cinematographer Nicholas Musuraca. The screenplay was written by Byron Morgan and Louis Stevens, based on an original story by Stevens. In an unusual move, Bruce Cabot was the star, with perennial "good guy" Ralph Bellamy playing the villain in a love triangle involving Arline Judge and Eric Linden. Although considered a "B" feature, audiences enjoyed the aerial scenes, which helped elevate the feature to a minor box-office hit.

Plot
The "Black Cats", who are part of the Aerial Circus run by "Speed" Hardy (Ralph Bellamy), are a vagabond troupe of aerial performers in the 1930s. Speed takes on a new performer, former airmail pilot Ace Murray (Bruce Cabot). After performing a "double parachute" jump with his kid brother Bud (Eric Linden), who is also a pilot, Ace becomes aware that his brother is enamoured with Speed's young wife Ann (Arline Judge). Bud and Ann perform the dangerous double parachute jump together, becoming the show's main attraction, but Speed becomes jealous of the romance forming between them. After a flight together, Bud and Ann crash-land and spend a night in a deserted cabin, leading to the realization that Ann must seek a divorce.  When Speed discovers them, he apparently agrees to the new circumstances and surprisingly offers to design a new aerial stunt for Bud and himself that will have two aircraft colliding "head-on", with both of the pilots bailing out before the impact.

Before the stunt takes place, another pilot who is usually inebriated, "Screwy" Edwards (Cliff Edwards), reveals that Speed has deliberately cut his rival's parachute and is planning an aerial murder. Ace takes off and crashes into Speed, sacrificing his life to save his brother. The two lovers eventually marry and due to Ace's earlier help in obtaining a job for him, Bud begins an airline career as a pilot alongside Edwards, who has begun a rehabilitation.

Cast
As appearing in Flying Devils, (main roles and screen credits identified):
 Bruce Cabot as "Ace" Murray
 Arline Judge as Ann Hardy
 Eric Linden as Bud Murray
 Ralph Bellamy as "Speed" Hardy
 Cliff Edwards as "Screwy" Edwards
 June Brewster as Betty
 Frank LaRue as Al Kern
 Mary Carr as Mrs. Murray

Production
David O Selznick brought in Merian C. Cooper, first as a writer, then associate producer and finally as executive producer, relying on him to get RKO back on its feet and in the black. Cooper, best remembered for masterminding the production of King Kong, was also an aviator. It was natural for RKO to feature a slate of air-minded pictures once Cooper was in charge.

Primarily shot in a backlot, Flying Devils  overcame some of the limitations of the low-budget film format. Principal photography was begun in April 1933, using the RKO set at the Russell Brothers Ranch at Triunfo, with additional filming at Mines Field and Van Nuys, California. The aircraft used were a mix of Standard J-1, Stearman C-3R, Travel Air 2000 and 4000 stalwarts, the typical movie armada of the time.

Reception
In his August 26, 1933, review in The New York Times, Frank Nugent considered Flying Devils as a tried and true formula film. "The materials woven into its plot have seen so much service that most audiences will welcome them as old and trusted friends. There are, for example, the eternal triangle, brotherly love, the enaction of the theme, 'greater love hath no man,' &c.<sic>, and, finally, the always simple expedient of killing off the non-essential characters." Richard B. Jewell, Professor of American Film at the University of Southern California, wrote in The RKO Story, "... director Russell Birdwell, best known as one of the demon press agents of the era, was able to pump enough zip into the proceedings to please the public; it became a bantam box-office hit."

References

Notes

Citations

Bibliography

 Jewell, Richard B. The RKO Story. New Rochelle, New York: Arlington House, 1982; .
 Wynne, H. Hugh. The Motion Picture Stunt Pilots and Hollywood's Classic Aviation Movies. Missoula, Montana: Pictorial Histories Publishing Co., 1987; .

External links
 
 
 
 

1933 films
American romantic drama films
American aviation films
American black-and-white films
1933 romantic drama films
RKO Pictures films
Films with screenplays by Dalton Trumbo
Films with screenplays by Nathanael West
1930s English-language films
1930s American films